John Sutton (1928 - May 1989) was an Irish sportsperson.  He played hurling with his local club Mullinavat and was a member of the Kilkenny senior inter-county team in the 1950s.  With Kilkenny Sutton won an All-Ireland title and three Leinster titles.

References 

1928 births
1989 deaths
Kilkenny inter-county hurlers
All-Ireland Senior Hurling Championship winners
Mullinavat hurlers